This is a list of representative peers elected from the Peerage of Ireland to sit in the British House of Lords after the Kingdom of Ireland was brought into union with the Kingdom of Great Britain. No new members were added to the House after 1919, due to the creation of the Irish Free State, however, the already sitting members continued to remain part of the House, with the last member dying in 1961.

Once elected, peers held their seats for life. Some of these peers were granted a title in the Peerage of the United Kingdom which gave them a hereditary seat in the House of Lords. These peers also remained as representative peers and were not replaced until their deaths.

List of Irish representative peers

1800–1850

1850–1900

1900–1919

Remaining Representative Peers after 1922

Representative peers with a title in the Peerage of the United Kingdom

See also

List of Scottish representative peers

References

Ireland and the Commonwealth of Nations
Representative peers
Irish representative peers

Peerage of Ireland